Lindgren oxidation  is a selective method for oxidizing aldehydes to carboxylic acids. The reaction is named after Bengt O. Lindgren.

The oxidation takes place in water containing solvent mixtures under slightly acidic conditions (pH 3–5) with sodium chlorite as oxidizer. To avoid complicated oxidation reactions the hypochlorite, which is formed in the reaction, has to be removed from the reaction mixture by scavengers. In the original publication, sulfamic acid and resorcinol were used. George A. Kraus and co-workers were the first to use 2-methyl-2-butene as scavenger under buffered conditions for the oxidation of an aliphatic and an α,β-unsaturated aldehyde. Later hydrogen peroxide also proved to work to remove the hypochlorite.

See also
 Pinnick oxidation

References

Organic oxidation reactions
Organic redox reactions
Name reactions